Martín Jesús Castillo Sánchez (born 9 June 1988 in Salamanca, Guanajuato) is a Mexican professional footballer, who plays for Correcaminos of Ascenso MX.

References

1988 births
Living people
People from Salamanca, Guanajuato
Footballers from Guanajuato
Mexican footballers
Alebrijes de Oaxaca players
Correcaminos UAT footballers
Liga MX players
Association footballers not categorized by position